Fairway Market is an American grocery chain, founded in 1933 by Nathan Glickberg. It is currently one of the store banners owned by the Wakefern Food Corporation, a company famous for its flagship supermarket cooperative network, ShopRite.

The flagship store, which stands at Broadway and West 74th Street, on the Upper West Side of Manhattan, is one of four surviving stores, as of 2020, that are currently operated by Wakefern cooperative member, Village Super Markets.

Sale to private equity

Fairway Market is a specialty market with four locations in Manhattan. Founded in 1933, Fairway Market is most known for its fine foods, including coffee, cheese, and olives. It also offers NYC's largest variety of organic foods. The supermarket has a "Gotta Have It Way" program, where customers can request products to be brought into the store.

Sterling Investment Partners, a private equity firm in Westport, Connecticut, bought a controlling stake in Fairway Market in January 2007 and committed to substantially expanding the chain in the Greater New York area. Sterling made a $150 million capital investment in Fairway and enabled the enterprise to grow rapidly.

In 2011, the chain had revenues of $550 million. It was spun off in an IPO on April 17, 2013, trading under its parent, Fairway Group Holdings Corp., on the NASDAQ under the ticker symbol "FWM".

Stores 

The original Fairway Market at West 74th Street on Manhattan's Upper West Side was a produce shop. By 1997, it had expanded with a café that  became a steakhouse at night.

In 2011, Fairway opened two more locations: one on the Upper East Side of Manhattan, which opened on July 20, and the other in the Douglaston neighborhood of Queens, which opened on November 16. In 2012, Fairway Market opened three more locations: in Woodland Park, New Jersey, on June 6; Westbury, New York, on August 22; and Kips Bay in Manhattan in late December. In 2013, Fairway Market opened a location in Chelsea, Manhattan, and another at The Shops at Nanuet shopping mall in Nanuet, New York.

As of 2020, all but five of these Fairway stores have either closed or sold to other retailers, including Amazon. The sequence of all stores is as follows:
1930s: The flagship store, still occupies the original Broadway location in the Upper West Side.
1995: Fairway's Harlem store opened in a significantly larger space. This store had a  enclosed space, known as the "Cold Room," which contained the store's meats, seafood, dairy products, and beer. Silver coats hung nearby for customers who wished to keep warm while browsing the freezer. Without a bidder after the company's second bankruptcy, the store closed in July 2020.
2001: The company opened its first store outside the city in the Long Island community of Plainview. 
2006: The company opened its fourth store in Red Hook, Brooklyn. In July 2020 this store was sold to Bogopa Service Corporation to be reopened as a Food Bazaar supermarket.
2009: On March 25th, Fairway's fifth store opened in the Fashion Center shopping mall in suburban Paramus, New Jersey, taking up a majority of the mall's former interior space. This was the first Fairway store located west of the Hudson River and the first location ever to open in the entire state of New Jersey. In March 2020, it was announced that the Paramus location would close. The official closing date for the Paramus location was supposed to be May 15, 2020, but it was delayed to the summer of 2020 due to the effects of the COVID-19 pandemic.
2010: On April 14th, Fairway opened a new branch in a former Kmart in the Westchester County village of Pelham Manor, directly across the border with the Bronx. This became Fairway's third location in the New York City suburbs and sixth overall. Fairway opened its first Wine and Spirit store adjacent to the market. The second wine and spirit superstore was opened adjacent to the Stamford market.
2010: In November, Fairway's seventh and largest location to date at over  opened in Stamford, Connecticut.
2011: Fairway opened a location on the Upper East Side of Manhattan on 86th Street, between Second and Third Avenues.
Fairway also opened a location in Douglaston, Queens in 2011. In July 2020 this store was sold to Bogopa Service Corporation to be reopened as a Food Bazaar supermarket.
2012: In June, Fairway opened its tenth food store and third Wine and Spirits Store in Woodland Park, New Jersey, in a renovated former Pathmark Super Center store. The company closed business at this location on April 1, 2020, with the location replaced by an Amazon Go market.
2012: In August, Fairway Market opened a  store in the Roosevelt Raceway Center in Westbury in August 2012.
2012: In December, Fairway opened their Kips Bay, Manhattan location on East 30th Street and Second Avenue. 
2013: In July, Fairway Market opened their 13th store in Chelsea, Manhattan at Sixth Avenue on July 24, 2013.
2013: In October, Fairway opened their 14th store in Nanuet, New York, at The Shops at Nanuet mall on October 10, 2013. The store closed on September 25, 2019.
2014: Fairway Market opened a store in the DSW Plaza in Lake Grove, New York on July 23, 2014. This store was the first Fairway Market location in Suffolk County on Long Island and the 15th food store in the metropolitan area. The company closed the store after only two years.
2017: In January, Fairway opened a store in a Georgetown (Brooklyn) strip mall. In March 2020, the store was sold to Key Food for $5 million.

References

External links 

American companies established in 1933
Retail companies established in 1933
1933 establishments in New York City
Supermarkets of the United States
Retail companies based in New York City
Privately held companies based in New York City
Companies formerly listed on the Nasdaq
2013 initial public offerings
Companies that filed for Chapter 11 bankruptcy in 2016
Companies that filed for Chapter 11 bankruptcy in 2020
Wakefern Food Corporation